Stephen Marcus (born Stephen Mark Scott; 18 June 1962) is a British actor, best known for his role as Nick the Greek in the film Lock, Stock and Two Smoking Barrels.

Career
Marcus became an actor in 1984 after three years of training at Arts Educational Schools in London; he spent the first six months of his career touring throughout London's parks and schools in Robin Hood & The Tree Trick, which was quickly followed by his first film role as Moose in the cult film My Beautiful Laundrette.

After a few years working in theatre, commercials and supporting roles on television, Marcus joined the cast of fledgling comedy Birds of a Feather as Dave, the lover of Sharon (Pauline Quirke).

A year of acting in commercials introduced Marcus to director Peter Chelsom. Chelsom cast him right away as Gordon in Hear My Song, opposite Ned Beatty. This was followed by roles on British television, in programmes such as The Hot Dog Wars, Dangerfield, Class Act, Kavanagh QC and Our Friends in the North. Meanwhile, Marcus's movie career was also progressing, with roles opposite Timothy Dalton in The Beautician and the Beast, Robert Englund in The Killer Tongue and Richard Harris in Savage Hearts.

In 1996 Marcus's agent arranged a meeting for a small low-budget movie with a then-unknown director named Guy Ritchie; Ritchie offered Marcus the role of Nick the Greek in Lock, Stock and Two Smoking Barrels alongside Nick Moran, Vinnie Jones, Jason Statham and Matthew Vaughn. Three years later, the film was released and garnered a high level of success.

Lock, Stock and Two Smoking Barrels led to further movie roles. Marcus completed a small role in Alan Parker's Angela's Ashes; he played Bouchon in Quills, alongside Kate Winslet, Michael Caine, Joaquin Phoenix and Geoffrey Rush; for Richard Eyre, he played Iris opposite Judi Dench and acted in Complete Female Stage Beauty with Claire Danes; and he also attained the role of Ted Ray in The Greatest Game Ever Played, directed by Bill Paxton.

Alongside a very successful movie career, Marcus also starred in several American, Canadian and UK television series: Starhunter 2300, in which he played Rudolpho De Luna; he played the co-lead in the BBC series Cavegirl; he played Banjo and Broadman in the adaptations of Terry Pratchett's Hogfather and The Colour of Magic, respectively; he starred in the two 20th anniversary episodes of "Casualty"; and Marcus also appeared in regular roles in Kingdom (with Stephen Fry) and Larkrise to Candleford. Marcus has also completed two films with the Wachowskis: Speed Racer and Ninja Assassin.

In 2012 Marcus appeared in five feature films: It’s A Lot, Two Days in the Smoke, Gridiron UK, AB Negative and Fast & Furious 6. In April 2012, he completed filming for independent British gangster thriller Two Days in the Smoke, in which he played the hitman Ben, alongside Snatch star Alan Ford and Matt Di Angelo from BBC Hustle. Smoke director Ben Pickering cast him as the vengeful Max in his second feature, the British psychological thriller Welcome to Curiosity, due for release on 25 May 2018 in the US and Canada.

In July 2012, Marcus launched a new Gangster London walking tour in association with Brit Movie Tours, in which he explores the dark history of London's East End. He also starred in Perry Bhandal's Interview with a Hitman (2012) as Traffikant, a Romanian Crime Boss, alongside Luke Goss.

In May 2013, Marcus played the roles of Varney, Homeless man, Letting Agent & First Guard in a BBC radio adaptation of Neil Gaiman's Neverwhere, adapted by Dirk Maggs.

Personal life

Marcus is married to Sarah and owns two small dogs, Fry and Ronnie. He has two main hobbies: golf and American Football, the latter of which he used to play and coach.

Marcus played American football in the UK for the BAFL One team Sussex Thunder and retired at the end of the 2007 season. He was interviewed for Sky Sports' Sunday NFL coverage after the Thunder's 2007 fixture at the Ipswich Cardinals. The interview, which was broadcast on 21 October 2007, discussed his acting career, as well as American Football. Marcus has been an offensive line coach at the London Olympians and at Valley Trojans.

TV and filmography

My Beautiful Laundrette (1985) as Moose
Brush Strokes (1987, TV Series) as 2nd Pub Customer
Boon (1989, TV Series) as Curly Robinson
Birds of a Feather (1989-1991, TV Series) as Dave
The Bill (1989-2007, TV Series) as Cliff Taylor / Tony Bladwell / Ade Lester / Wayne Smith / Purkis
Arrivederci Millwall (1990) as Mal
Stay Lucky (1990, TV Series) as Neil
Van der Valk (1991, TV Series) as Burly Man
Hear My Song (1991) as Gordon
Red Dwarf (1993, TV Series) as Bear Strangler McGee
KYTV (1993, TV Series) as Large Man
Between the Lines (1993, TV Series) as Mortuary Assistant
99-1 (1994, TV Series) as McCarthy's Man / Pursuer
Frank Stubbs Promotes (1994, TV Series) as Journalist
Screen One (1994, TV Series) as Newman
The Glam Metal Detectives (1995, Series) as Man with Machine Gun / Bailiff / Yacko the Yeti / Jim Dumper
Savage Hearts (1995) as Hector
Rumble (1995, TV Series) as Melvin
Class Act (1995, TV Series) as Geoff
The Thin Blue Line (1995, TV Series) as Terry
Coogan's Run (1995, TV Series) as Gerald the Sumo Magician
Our Friends in the North (1996, TV Mini-Series) as Cyril Hellyer
Killer Tongue (1996) as Ralph
Kavanagh QC (1996, TV Series) as Baxter
The Detectives (1997, TV Series) as Fat Reg
The Beautician and the Beast (1997) as Ivan
The Black Velvet Band (1997, TV Movie) as Nudge
Paul Merton in Galton and Simpson's... (1997, TV Series) as Thug
Lock, Stock and Two Smoking Barrels (1998) as Nick the Greek
Dangerfield (1998, TV Series) as Jay Butterfield
Adam's Family Tree (1999, TV Series) as Bulgar the Bulgarian
Roger Roger (1999, TV Series) as Detective Sergeant Calderwood
Angela's Ashes (1999) as English Agent
Sorted (2000) as Rob
Quills (2000) as Bouchon
Starhunter (2000-2004, TV Series) as Rudolpho DeLuna
Londinium (2001) as Davey	
Iris (2001) as Taxi Driver
Redemption Road (2001, writer) as Joe
AKA (2002) as Tommy
Unconditional Love (2002) as Thug in Rain
Cavegirl (2002, TV Series) as Dad
 The Basil Brush Show (2002) as Santa Claus
Don't Look Back (2003, writer) as Uncle Max
The Baby Juice Express (2004) as Lenny Von Something
Stage Beauty (2004) as Thomas Cockerell
The Greatest Game Ever Played (2005) as Ted Ray
Kinky Boots (2005) as Big Mike
Without a Trace (2006, TV Series) as Roger 	
Casualty (2006, TV Series) as Tommy Indler
Terry Pratchett's Hogfather (2006, TV Movie) as Banjo Cropper
Doctor Who (2007, Episode: "The Shakespeare Code") as Jailer
Kingdom (2007, TV Series) as Hill
Terry Pratchett's The Colour of Magic (2008, TV Mini-Series) as Broadman
Lark Rise to Candleford (2008, TV Series) as Matthew Welby
Speed Racer (2008) as Security Goon
Sunshine (2008, TV Mini-Series) as Big Alan
Little Dorrit (2008, TV Series) as Jonson
Ninja Assassin (2009) as Kingpin
Midsomer Murders (2011, TV Series) as Silas Trout
The Hot Potato (2012) as Freddie
Interview with a Hitman (2012) as Traffikant
The Comic Strip (2012, TV Series) as Dirty Douglas
Holby City (2013, TV Series) as Jarvis Wells
Getting Back to Zero (2013) as Tommy
Fast & Furious 6 (2013) as Davies
Justin and the Knights of Valour (2013) as Guard #1, 2, 3 (voice)
It's a Lot (2013) as Mr. Hatherly
AB Negative (2014) as Mr. Fines
The Smoke (2014) as Ben
Sanctuary (2016) as Joseph
The Gridiron (2016) as Eddie
The Coroner episode 2.3 "Those in Peril" as Gobby Mitchell
The Rizen (2017) as The Executioner
Fanged Up (2017) as Reeves
Rise of the Footsoldier 3 (2017) as Jack Whomes
Walk like a Panther (2018) as 'Gladiator' Glenn Higgins
Welcome to Curiosity (2018) as Max

References

External links

Sussex Thunder American Football Team
London Olympians American Football Team

1962 births
Living people
Male actors from Portsmouth
English male film actors
English male television actors
20th-century English male actors
21st-century English male actors